Diamond Rexx is an American heavy metal / glam metal band from Chicago, Illinois, formed in 1985 by singer Nasti Habits and guitarist Scott St. Lust (aka S. Scot Priest, also of D'Molls).

History
Singer Nasti Habits created the original four-member lineup with guitarist S.S. Priest in 1985. Four months after their first live show the band signed a management deal with Mark Nawara who then got the band signed to Island records, and with the addition of bassist Andre and drummer Johnny Cottone they released their debut album Land of the Damned in 1986. In 1989, the band signed to the independent Red Light Records, where they released their second album Rated Rexx in 1990. and third release Golden Gates in 1991.  The album boasted S.S. Priest on guitar but actually all guitars were performed by John Luckhaupt (aka: Johnny L. Angel) who had left the band just before the album's release. The band went on hiatus in the 1990s, but Habits formed a new line-up in 2001, now with S.S. Priest on guitar, Basil Cooper (Ex-Daisy Chain/Mind Bomb) on bass and background vocals and Billy Nychay on drums, now influenced by alternative metal. This line-up recorded the Rexx Erected album, released on the Diamond label, after which Cooper left to be replaced by Tommy Hanus. The Evil was released in 2002 on Crash Music. In 2006 bassist Tommy Evans joined the band, and the following year, original drummer Johnny Cottone returned on drums. The band then went dormant and remained quiet over the next few years. In 2009 the original line-up of Habits/Andre/Priest/Cottone reunited for a twenty-year anniversary show.

Band members

Current members
Nasti Habits – lead vocals (1985–present) 
S.S. Priest – lead & rhythm guitars (1985–1995, 2000–present)
Dave Andre – bass (1985–1989, 2004–present)
George Lunacy Lorenzi - Drums 1993,2017-2018,2021-Present

Former members
Johnny L. Angel – lead & rhythm guitars (1987–1990)
Chrissy Salem – bass, backing vocals (1988–1992)
Basil Cooper – bass, backing vocals (1992–1993) (2001–2002)
Tim Tully – drums, percussion (1987–1988)
Billy Nychay – drums, percussion (1989–2003)
Rob Pace – drums, percussion (2003)
Bill Schmidt – drums, percussion (2004–2007)
Tommy Evans – bass
Tommy Hanus – bass
George Lunacy Lorenzi – Drums (1992–1993 & 2017-2018)2021-Present

Crew and staff
 Danny Brasky – Stage and Sound
 Jim Haupert – Lighting and Promotions
 Billy Cafero
 Chris Johnson
 Billy Johnson
 Lynn Drake

Discography

Albums
Land of the Damned (1986)
Rated Rexx (1990)
Golden Gates (1991)
Rexx Erected (2001)
The Evil (2002).                                                            
Psych Ward (2020)

EPs
Golden Gates (1989)

References

External links 
Diamond Rexx at MusicMight

Heavy metal musical groups from Illinois
Musical groups established in 1985
1985 establishments in Illinois